A sensory unit is a single afferent neuron with its receptor endings. It is the smallest unit of sensory response.

Neurohistology